Marie-Victoire Davril (sometimes d'Avril or Davrel) (1755–1820) was a French portrait painter.

Born in Paris, Davril was a pupil of Adélaïde Labille-Guiard, and exhibited in 1783 at the Salon de la Correspondance and the place Dauphine; at the former a miniature portrait of her by Marie-Madeleine Frémy. She appears to have been close to her fellow pupil Marie-Gabrielle Capet, being remembered in the latter's will. She was the universal heir of wine merchant Edmé-Jean Cottin; the couple were not married, but were evidently closely connected, although the exact nature of their relationship remains unknown. Davril died at Guibeville. A posthumous inventory was taken, finding a number of artworks as well as furniture and 4410 francs in cash. Davril was active in oil paint, pastel, and miniatures during her career.

References

1755 births
1820 deaths
French women painters
French portrait painters
18th-century French painters
18th-century French women artists
19th-century French painters
19th-century French women artists
Painters from Paris
Pastel artists
Portrait miniaturists
Pupils of Adélaïde Labille-Guiard